The Petite rivière de la Loutre is a watercourse flowing into Gulf of St. Lawrence, flowing in the eastern part of the municipality of L'Île-d'Anticosti, in the Minganie Regional County Municipality, in the administrative region of Côte-Nord, in the province of Quebec, in Canada.

A forest road runs along the valley of this river. Forestry is the main economic activity in the western part of this area; secondly, recreational tourism activities, especially for the eastern part which is part of the SÉPAQ Anticosti.

Geography 
The Petite rivière de la Loutre flows between the rivière aux Loups Marins (located to the east) and the Corbet stream (located to the west).

The Petite rivière de la Loutre draws its source from a very small lake located in the eastern part of Anticosti Island. This source is located on the southeast side of Lac au Renard (head water body of Rivière au Renard), either at:
  east of the town center of the village of Port-Menier;
  south of Prinsta Bay, located on the north shore of Anticosti Island;
  north of the south shore of Anticosti Island.

This mouth is located at the end of a small bay, between Pointe aux Oies (located on the east side) and Pointe de la Croix (located on the west side).

Toponymy 
The toponym "Petite rivière de la Loutre" was made official on September 12, 1974, at the Place Names Bank of the Commission de toponymie du Québec.

See also 
 List of rivers of Quebec

References 

Rivers of Côte-Nord
Minganie Regional County Municipality
Anticosti Island